Darjijari is a small village in Mandar Tehsil in Ranchi district in Jharkhand State, India. Mandar, Bero, Chanho, Burmu, are the nearby towns to Darjijari. Darjijari is reachable by Tangarbasuli Railway Station, Narkopi Railway Station, Itky Railway Station, Nagjua Railway Station. Its main Village Panchayat is Darjijari Panchayat.

Villages in Ranchi district